Miguel Soler may refer to:
 Miguel Soler (gymnast) (born 1960), Spanish gymnast
 Miguel Soler (educator) (1922–2021), Uruguayan educational theorist
 Miguel Estanislao Soler (1783–1849), Argentine general

See also
 Miquel Soler (born 1965), Spanish footballer and manager